Tsymbal or Tsimbal (or Цимбал) is a surname. Notable people with the surname include:

 Bogdan Tsymbal (born 1997), Ukrainian biathlete
 Kostiantyn Tsymbal (born 1993), Ukrainian karateka
 Mykola Tsymbal (born 1984), Ukrainian footballer
 Nikolai Tsymbal (1925–2020), Soviet military officer
 Yevgeni Tsimbal (born 1986), Russian footballer

See also
 

Ukrainian-language surnames